Xenoscapa  is a genus of herbaceous, perennial and bulbous plants in the family Iridaceae. It consists of only three species distributed in Africa, and is closely related to the genera Freesia. The genus name is derived from the Greek words xenos, meaning "strange", and scapa, meaning "flowering stem".

Species
The list of Xenoscapa species, with their complete name and authority, and their geographic distribution is given below.
 
Xenoscapa fistulosa (Spreng. ex Klatt) Goldblatt & J.C.Manning, Syst. Bot. 20: 172 (1995). Distributed from Namibia to South Africa.
Xenoscapa grandiflora Goldblatt & J.C.Manning, Bothalia 41: 284 (2011). Namibia
Xenoscapa uliginosa Goldblatt & J.C.Manning, Syst. Bot. 20: 173 (1995). South Africa.

References 

Iridaceae genera
Iridaceae
Taxa named by Peter Goldblatt